This article lists mosques from around the world by available capacity, that belong to any Islamic school or branch, that can accommodate at least 15,000 worshippers in all available prayer ( or ) spaces such as prayer halls, courtyards and porticoes. All the mosques in this list are also Jama Masjids – a type of mosque that hosts the Friday prayer (known as ) in congregation.

List of mosques

See also
 Islamic architecture
 Holiest sites in Islam
 Lists of mosques
 List of the oldest mosques
 List of tallest mosques
 List of tallest minarets

References

 Largest
Religion-related lists of superlatives
Mosques